D.Holic (Hangul: 디홀릭) was a South Korean girl group formed by Star Road Entertainment (formerly H.Mate Entertainment) in 2014 with five members. Nine left the group in August 2015, due to personal reasons, and was replaced by new member, Hwajung. In July 2016, it was revealed through teasers that Danbee and Duri had decided to leave the group, new member, EJ, was added to the line-up. In February 2017, it was confirmed through a performance that members Hami and Hwajung had departed from the group. They were temporary replaced with new members, Nayoung and Youjin, although they never officially made their debut. In July 2017, EJ announced that she would be leaving the group to pursue a modelling career. The group informally disbanded after the departure of all but one member, with the aim of re-debuting the remaining member, Rena, into a new girl group within a year. The group has released one mini-album: Chewy (2015) and three single albums: D.Holic Dark With Dignity (2014), Murphy & Sally (2015), and Color Me Rad (2016).

Former members
 Nine (나인)
 Danbee (단비)
 Duri (두리)
 Hami (하미)
 Rena (레나)
 Hwajung (화정)
 EJ (이제이)
 Nayoung (나영)
 Youjin (유진)

Timeline

Discography

Extended plays

Single albums

Singles

References

External links 
 

K-pop music groups
South Korean girl groups
South Korean dance music groups
South Korean pop music groups
Musical groups from Seoul
Musical groups established in 2014
2014 establishments in South Korea
Musical groups disestablished in 2017
2017 disestablishments in South Korea